Mokhzani bin Tun Dr. Mahathir (born 2 January 1961) is a Malaysian businessman who has been listed as the 14th richest person in Malaysia. He worked as a petroleum engineer before founding oil-equipment fabricator Kencana Petroleum. Kencana Petroleum later merged with SapuraCrest to form SapuraKencana Petroleum. The company is now known as Sapura Energy.

Mokhzani was formerly a senior official in Kedah UMNO, but has since retired from politics. He is the second eldest son of the former Prime Minister of Malaysia Tun Dr. Mahathir Mohamad.

Career
Like his younger brother Mukhriz, Mokhzani is a businessman and had played an active role in United Malays National Organisation (UMNO), and at one time serving as the Youth's Wing treasurer. As of 2006, Mokhzani was an UMNO delegate of one of the constituencies in Kedah, but has since lain dormant in his political activities. In May 2008, he followed his father's footsteps to quit UMNO, after 22 years as a member of the Sungai Layar Hujung branch of UMNO.

In June 2019, Mokhzani resigned from all positions in Opcom Group due to "personal reasons".

Personal life
Mokhzani is currently married to Mastisa Mohamed, a businesswoman. Together they have five children, and currently reside in Kuala Lumpur.

Personal fortune
Mokhzani has been listed as the 14th richest person in Malaysia by Forbes Asia with an estimated net worth of US$685 million in 2012. Mokhzani was also the chairman of the Sepang International Circuit.

Honours
  :
 Commander of the Order of Loyalty to the Crown of Malaysia (PSM) – Tan Sri (2014)
  :
 Knight Companion of the Order of Loyalty to the Royal House of Kedah (DSDK) – Dato' (2001)

References

External links
 The Person
 The son rises from father's shadow
 Mahathir fails to become a delegate
 Politik Negeri Kedah
 Interview for Majalah Dewan Ekonomi January 2008

People from Kedah
Malaysian Muslims
Malaysian people of Malay descent
Malaysian people of Minangkabau descent
Malaysian people of Indian descent
Malaysian people of Malayali descent
Mahathir Mohamad family
Living people
Malaysian businesspeople
Former United Malays National Organisation politicians
Children of prime ministers of Malaysia
Commanders of the Order of Loyalty to the Crown of Malaysia
1962 births